Verse is a networking protocol allowing real-time communication between computer graphics software.  For example, several architects can build a house in the same virtual environment using their own computers, even if they are using different software.  If one architect builds a spiral staircase, it instantly appears on the screens of all other users.  Verse is designed to use the capacity of one or multiple computers over the Internet: for example, allowing a user with a hand-held computer in Spain to work with the rendering power of a supercomputer in Japan. Its principles are very general, allowing its use in contexts that are advantageous to collaboration such as gaming and visual presentations.

Uni-Verse 
The Swedish Royal Institute of Technology (KTH), with several collaborators including the Interactive Institute, set up an EU project called Uni-Verse. The EU Commission granted them nearly SEK 18 million over the next several years to develop a system for graphics, sound, and acoustics using Verse and making it into an Open Source platform.

Verse-enabled projects 
 Blender
 Crystal Space
 Love

External links 
Verse Project Page
Love the Game which uses the Verse protocol
Video podcast covering the Verse project
Community site for Verse developers
New Verse Protocol by Jiri Hnidek
  (Defunct as of October 2012)
 (Defunct)

Network protocols
Computer graphics